The 2018 Northwest Territories Scotties Tournament of Hearts, the provincial women's curling championship for Northwest Territories, was held January 4–7 at the Inuvik Curling Club in Inuvik, Northwest Territories. The winning Kerry Galusha team represented Northwest Territories at the 2018 Scotties Tournament of Hearts.

Teams

The teams are listed as follows:

Round-robin standings

Scores

January 4
Draw 1
Galusha 6-2 Bain
Mitchell 10-1 Lennie

January 5
Draw 2
Galusha 12-0 Lennie
Mitchell 10-2 Bain

January 6
Draw 3
Bain 12-8 Lennie
Mitchell 2-13 Galusha

Draw 4
Galusha 11-1 Mitchell
Lennie 12-8 Bain

January 7
Draw 5
Bain 13-10 Mitchell
Lennie 2-8 Galusha

Draw 6
Galusha 9-2 Bain
Mitchell 12-11 Lennie

References

Saskatchewan Scotties Tournament of Hearts
2018 in the Northwest Territories
January 2018 sports events in Canada
Curling in the Northwest Territories
Inuvik